The 2014 Thüringen Rundfahrt der Frauen is the 27th edition of the Thüringen Rundfahrt der Frauen, a women's cycling stage race in Germany. It is rated by the UCI as a category 2.1 race and is held between 14 and 20 July 2014.

Teams competing

Stages

Prologue
14 July 2014 – Gotha to Gotha,

Stage 1
15 July 2014 – Erfurt to Erfurt,

Stage 2
16 July 2014, – Schleiz to Schleiz,

Stage 3
17 July 2014 – Gera to Gera (individual time trial),

Stage 4
18 July 2014 – Saalfeld to Saalfeld,

Stage 5
19 July 2014 – Schmölln to Schmölln,

Stage 6
20 July 2013 – Zeulenroda-Triebes to Zeulenroda-Triebes,

Classification leadership

See also

 Thüringen Rundfahrt der Frauen
 2014 in women's road cycling

References

External links

Thuringen Rundfahrt der Frauen
Thüringen Rundfahrt der Frauen
Thuringen Rundfahrt der Frauen